Alexander Guy Cook (born 23 August 1990) is an English music producer, singer, songwriter and the head of the UK record label PC Music. 
Cook released his first solo singles in 2014. He has also collaborated with PC Music artists such as Hannah Diamond, GFOTY, EASYFUN, Danny L Harle and felicita. He formed the one-off project QT with musician Sophie and performance artist Hayden Dunham, producing the 2014 single "Hey QT". 

Cook came into the public eye as Charli XCX's creative director and has executively produced her projects: Number 1 Angel, Pop 2, Charli and How I'm Feeling Now. Cook was named #12 in the Dazed 100 for "redefining style and youth culture in 2015 and beyond". Cook released his two debut albums, 7G and Apple, and received the Variety Hitmakers Innovator of The Year Award in 2020. In 2022, he produced the song "All Up in Your Mind" from Beyoncé's album Renaissance, which earned him a nomination for the Grammy Award for Album of the Year.

Since founding PC Music in August 2013, Cook's label has represented over 20 artists releasing music within a similar style, in which tropes from mainstream 1990s and 2000s pop music are amplified. This style of exaggerated pop tropes grew to serve as the foundation of the genre hyperpop, which Cook is credited for developing and popularising.

Early life 
Alexander Guy Cook is the son of English architect Sir Peter Cook and Israeli architect Yael Reisner. He attended Goldsmiths, University of London, where he studied music.

It was at Goldsmiths he reconnected with Danny L Harle, with whom he had gone to school as a teen. The two bonded over their shared musical tastes and interest in comedy duo Tim & Eric. This grew into a musical project called Dux Content.

Career

2011–2013: Career beginnings 
Since they did not have a vocalist, Dux Content focused on musical experiments like compound metres and changes in tempo. One of their earlier works was a collection of compositions for the Disklavier, released with Spencer Noble and Tim Phillips under the name "Dux Consort".

Cook created Gamsonite, a "pseudo-label" collecting his early collaborations. Dux Content released its songs with strange renderings of digital avatars for promotional artwork. They contributed to the score for Alicia Norman's animated film Heart of Death and began considering a children's television show titled Dux Content's Jungle Jam. Cook and Harle explored how to build rhythms out of a vocalist's natural singing tempo and released the results as "Dux Kidz". The project was noticed by producer Sophie, who later worked with PC Music's acts. Cook began working on building flashy websites with Hannah Diamond and decided to focus on using websites to promote music.

2013–2015: Foundation of PC Music 

In August 2013, Cook founded PC Music as a way of embracing an A&R role, with the aim of "recording people who don't normally make music and treating them as if they're a major label artist." In January 2014, Cook released "Keri Baby" as his first solo single, with vocals by Diamond. The track uses pop clichés and glitchy vocals to depict Diamond as a digital entity on a screen. His follow-up single "Beautiful" was released in June. "Beautiful" is a pastiche of Eurodance, featuring high, pitch-shifted vocals and donk sounds. Fact magazine called it PC Music's "de-facto anthem", and the song received a remix from Scottish producer Rustie.

Cook worked with Sophie to produce a song for QT, a pop singer portrayed by American performance artist Hayden Dunham. She found Cook through his work online and wanted to use a song to market a QT energy drink. Their resulting collaboration "Hey QT" was released in August 2014 on XL Recordings.

On 22 December 2014, A. G. Cook released "What I Mean" from his "Personal Computer Music" mix as a single. The single was made available as a free download via radio presenter Annie Mac's "Free Music Monday" SoundCloud channel. Opening with muffled dialogue, the song incorporates robotic vocals and a sample of R&B artist Chuckii Booker. Its organ-based arrangement was a more soulful take on Cook's usual style of dance-pop. After discussing a collaboration on a Charli XCX album, Cook contributed an official remix of her single "Doing It" featuring Rita Ora.

Cook's work received recognition on year-end lists for 2014. "Keri Baby" was listed at number 5 of Dummy magazine's "20 Best Tracks of 2014", and BuzzFeed's "13 Obscure Tracks of 2014", number 1 on Gorilla vs. Bear's, "Favourite Tracks of 2014", number 2 on Dazed & Confuseds "Top 20 Tracks of 2014". Pitchfork Media ranked "Beautiful" number 30 on its list of "The 100 Best Tracks of 2014".

March 2015 saw Cook's PC Music head to the US to showcase all 11 of his label's talent at the Empire Garage in Austin, Texas as part of SXSW. The showcase received positive reviews, with The Guardian saying "AG Cook's entire thundering set [shows] this is a label refusing to be confined by definitions of genre or good taste." On 8 May 2015, Cook performed as part of a PC Music show at BRIC House in Brooklyn, New York as part of the Red Bull Music Academy Festival. The show was billed as the premiere of Pop Cube, "a multimedia reality network".

"Superstar", Cook's fifth single, was released via PC Music on 13 July 2016. On the day of its release, Cook revealed via Twitter that "Superstar" had been in the works for over two years prior, originally beginning as a "topline pitch" for electro house DJ Zedd.

In April 2016, experimental music producer Oneohtrix Point Never posted a cryptic video to his Instagram that appeared to show Cook working on a remix of "Sticky Drama", a single from his 2015 album Garden of Delete. The remix was later surprise-released on 16 December 2016.

2017–2020: Charli XCX, Jonsi and other ventures 
In March 2017, Charli XCX's mixtape Number 1 Angel was released, prominently featuring production by Cook and others, including PC Music artists and affiliates SOPHIE, Danny L Harle, Life Sim and EASYFUN, who created the project EasyFX with Cook. This was followed by the mixtape Pop 2, also featuring production by Cook and others. Pitchfork Media gave Pop 2 a rating of 8.4 out of 10, calling it "a vision of what pop music could be" and "the best full-length work of both Charli and PC Music's respective careers".

In November 2018, A. G. Cook contributed to Tommy Cash's second studio album ¥€$. Cook is credited as the producer on 5 tracks on the record, including lead single "X-RAY" which he co-produced with Danny L Harle.

Cook was announced as the co-executive producer for Charli XCX's third studio album Charli, which was released on 13 September 2019. Cook has produced six of the album's seven singles, including Gone, the third single from the album, which features Christine and the Queens. The song was awarded "Best New Track" by Pitchfork and best song of the week by Stereogum.

On 6 April 2020, Cook and BJ Burton were announced as co-executive producers for Charli XCX's quarantine album How I'm Feeling Now, which was written in an open-source style, sharing the production process online and utilizing fan input/content.

Cook produced the song "Exhale" by Jónsi, his first solo music in a decade, released on 23 April 2020. In July 2020 it was revealed Cook is the Executive producer on Shiver, Jónsi's new album which was released on 2 October 2020.

2020–present: 7G, Apple, Utada Hikaru and Beyoncé 
On 30 July 2020, Cook announced an upcoming studio album 7G. On 7 August 2020, he held a virtual concert featuring Caroline Polachek, Thy Slaughter and GRRL titled 7 by 7 over Zoom. The album was released through PC Music on 12 August, comprising 49 tracks split over seven discs.

On 20 August 2020, Cook announced another studio album, Apple. The announcement came with the release of the single "Oh Yeah". The album was released through PC Music on 18 September 2020.

Leading up to the release of his second album, Apple, Cook hosted another free livestream festival across Zoom, Bandcamp and Twitch entitled 'Appleville'. The festival featured intimate online performances from 100 gecs, Cali Cartier, Alaska Reid, Amnesia Scanner, Astra King, Baseck, Charli XCX, Clairo, Danger Inc, Dorian Electra, Felicita, Fraxiom, Hannah Diamond, Jimmy Edgar, Kero Kero Bonito, Namasenda, Ö, Oklou, Palmistry, Planet 1999 and Quiet Local. The event was described by Cook as "a pastoral escape in the comfort of your own home, an infinite green field where you can sit back and watch some of your favourite musicians grapple with the limitations of time & space". VIP tickets for the livestream were sold on Bandcamp and included access to select recordings from the concert. All proceeds from the ticket sales were donated to Mermaids and Black Cultural Archives.

After 5 years of collaborating with Charli XCX, in November 2020 the pair was awarded the Variety Hitmakers Innovator of The Year Award.

In December 2020, A. G. Cook has taken part in LUCKYME Records 12 Alternative Futures Advent Calendar Project. Baauer & A. G. Cook's "Planet's Mad" Remix was released on 10 December.

Cook has also collaborated with Japanese American singer-songwriter Hikaru Utada, co-producing the movie's theme song "One Last Kiss",  the soundtrack of the Japanese animated science fiction film Evangelion: 3.0+1.0 Thrice Upon a Time. The song was released on 9 March 2021, and reached #1 on the Japanese Japanese singles charts. He also co-produced another song with Utada, called "Kimi ni Muchuu", which reached #1 on Japanese singles charts, and remixed Utada's song "Face My Fears" for her album Bad Mode.

Beginning in April 2021, Cook began releasing remixes of songs from his two 2020 albums. Cook later announced that they would be included on a 21-track joint remix album titled Apple vs. 7G. The album was released on 28 May and features remixes from PC artists Easyfun and Hannah Diamond as well as Caroline Polachek, Charli XCX and No Rome.

Cook released the remixed version of No Rome's "Spinning", featuring Charli XCX and the 1975, in May 2021.

In June 2021, Cook hosted and curated his first show in a 4 part residency on BBC Radio 6 music as part of the 'Lose Yourself with...' series.

Cook contributed to Lady Gaga's Chromatica remix album, providing a remix for the track "911" alongside Charli XCX. The album, titled Dawn of Chromatica was released in September 2021 and featured remixes from Dorian Electra and Rina Sawayama.

In October 2021, Cook partnered with Apple Inc. to release "Start Up", a song that incorporates sounds from Apple products from the past 45 years. It was used as the intro music for an Apple media event that same month.

In 2022, he worked with Beyoncé co-writing and co-producing the song "All Up in Your Mind", which was included on her seventh studio album Renaissance. It earned his first Grammy Award nomination for Album of the Year.

Artistry 

Cook's style of music amplifies the clichés of mainstream pop music from the 1990s and 2000s. He follows the work of "mega-producers" such as Max Martin and Jimmy Jam and Terry Lewis. Cook references Scritti Politti's album Cupid & Psyche 85 for its "conscious decision to take pop music and make it as shiny and detailed as possible". He cites Korean and Japanese pop music as influences, as well as gyaru subculture.

Cook begins constructing tracks by constructing chords and melodies note by note. He prefers the sounds of virtual instruments and avoids sound design early in the process, giving his music a deadpan simplicity. He experiments with combining dissonant sounds, and the resulting dense, multi-layered arrangements are influenced by the Black MIDI techniques. Cook's arrangements are inspired by the mechanized music of composer Conlon Nancarrow. When collaborating with other artists, he prepares an extensive demo so that they can complete lyrics and record vocals straight away. Cook thoroughly processes the vocals, chopping them to use as a rhythmic element atop the melody.

In contrast to most of the artists on PC Music, Cook wears plain clothing. GFOTY jokingly characterised his style as normcore.

PC Music 
PC Music was founded by A. G. Cook in 2013 and made its first song available on SoundCloud in the same year. PC Music is known for its surreal or exaggerated take on pop music, often featuring pitch-shifted, feminine vocals and bright, synthetic textures. Artists on its roster include Hannah Diamond, Easyfun, Namasenda and Danny L Harle. The label has been characterized as embracing the aesthetics of advertising, consumerism and corporate branding. Its artists often present devised personas inspired by cyberculture. The label has inspired both praise and criticism from journalists and has been called "polarizing". In 2019 it was described by Dazed as one of the 'most exhilarating record labels of the 2010s.' In more recent years it has been noted for its influence on mainstream pop due to the production work by PC Music signees for artists such as Kim Petras, Charli XCX and Jónsi.

Personal life 
Cook moved to Los Angeles in 2019.

Discography 

 7G (2020)
 Apple (2020)

Filmography

Film

Music videos

References

External links 

A. G. Cook on Twitter
A. G. Cook on Instagram

1990 births
Living people
Musicians from London
PC Music artists
English record producers
English electronic musicians
English dance musicians
English pop musicians
Alumni of Goldsmiths, University of London
English people of Israeli descent
English experimental musicians
21st-century British musicians
English male singer-songwriters
21st-century British male singers
English Jews
Jewish English musicians
Jewish singers
Hyperpop musicians